Eugene Lammot (May 22, 1899 - March 1987) was an American politician who served as the  16th Lieutenant Governor of Delaware, from January 17, 1961, to January 19, 1965, under Governor Elbert N. Carvel.

External links
 Delaware's Lieutenant Governors

Lieutenant Governors of Delaware
Mayors of Wilmington, Delaware
1899 births
1987 deaths
20th-century American politicians